Chaisson is a surname. Notable people with the surname include:

Eric Chaisson (born 1946), American astronomer, educator and writer
Greg Chaisson, American bass guitarist
Joel Chaisson (born 1960), American politician
K'Lavon Chaisson (born 1999), American football player
Ray Chaisson (born 1918), American ice hockey player
Tim Chaisson (born 1986), Canadian singer-songwriter